Mochila is the Spanish language word for "knapsack" and may specifically refer to:

 Arhuaca mochila, a traditional shoulder bag made by the Arhuaco indigenous peoples of Colombia
 Pony Express mochila, a saddlebag used by Pony Express riders in the 19th century